York was an electoral district of the Legislative Assembly in the Australian state of Western Australia from 1890 to 1950.

The district was based on the rural town of York lying to the east of Perth. It was one of the original 30 seats contested at the 1890 election.

York was abolished at the 1950 election. Its last member, Charles Perkins of the Country Party, transferred to the seat of Roe.

Members

Election results

York
1890 establishments in Australia
Constituencies established in 1890
1950 disestablishments in Australia
Constituencies disestablished in 1950